Nermin Haskić (born 27 June 1989) is a Bosnian professional footballer who plays as a centre-forward for Bosnian Premier League club Velež Mostar.

Club career

Early career
Born in Banovići, SFR Yugoslavia, present-day Bosnia and Herzegovina, Haskić began his career with hometown club Budućnost, making his first-team debut in 2008. He was part of the Budućnost team that won the First League of FBiH in the 2009–10 season, thus achieving their promotion to the Bosnian Premier League.

During the 2010–11 Premier League season, Haskić scored 9 goals in 28 league appearances.

Sarajevo
In summer 2011, Haskić moved to Premier League side Sarajevo. Soon after arriving, he played with Sarajevo in their 2011–12 UEFA Europa League campaign. He scored the two decisive goals in a 2–0 aggregate victory over Swedish side Örebro SK; however, FK Sarajevo lost in the next round against Sparta Prague.

In the 2011–12 season, Haskić scored 8 goals to finish as FK Sarajevo's top scorer  and qualify them for the 2012–13 UEFA Europa League first qualifying round. Haskić moved abroad to Serbia in August 2012, joining Voždovac.

Voždovac
In the 2012–13 Serbian First League, the season where Haskić played for Voždovac he made 27 league appearances and scored 7 goals.

He was the best foreign top scorer in that season in the Serbian second tier. He left Voždovac in the summer of 2013.

Period in Slovakia
After his spell in Serbia, Haskić moved to Slovakia, where he played with Košice with whom he won the Slovak Cup in the 2013–14 season, Žilina and Ružomberok.

While he was at Žilina, he was also spontaneously loaned out to the B team of Žilina between 2015 and 2017. From January to June 2017, he was also loaned out to Podbeskidzie Bielsko-Biała.

Radnički Niš
In June 2018, Haskić moved to the Serbian SuperLiga side FK Radnički Niš.

In the 2018–19 Serbian SuperLiga he was not only the star player of Radnički, but also of the whole league, scoring 24 goals in 34 league games and finished as the league's top scorer. He also led Radnički to be title challengers, even though they did finish on 2nd place.

On 15 May 2019, it was announced that Haskić was included as one of the 11 players in the 2018–19 Serbian SuperLiga team of the season.

Omiya Ardija
In December 2019, Radnički announced that Haskić signed a contract with J2 League club Omiya Ardija for an undisclosed transfer fee.

Velež Mostar
In January 2022, Haskić signed with Velež Mostar, returning to the Bosnian Premier League.On 14 February 2022 he scored in the friendly match against Desna Chernihiv at the Winter sports camps in Antalya. In May 2022, he won the Bosnian Cup with Velež.

International career
Haskić made his debut for the Bosnia and Herzegovina national team in an unofficial match on 16 December 2011, in a 1–0  friendly loss against Poland.

Honours
Budućnost Banovići
First League of FBiH: 2009–10

Košice
Slovak Cup: 2013–14

Velež Mostar
Bosnian Cup: 2021–22

Individual
Awards
Serbian SuperLiga Team of the Season: 2018–19

Performance 
Serbian SuperLiga Top Scorer: 2018–19 (24 goals)

References

External links

1991 births
Living people
People from Banovići
Association football forwards
Bosnia and Herzegovina footballers
Bosnia and Herzegovina international footballers
FK Budućnost Banovići players
FK Sarajevo players
FK Voždovac players
FC VSS Košice players
MŠK Žilina players
Podbeskidzie Bielsko-Biała players
MFK Ružomberok players
FK Radnički Niš players
Omiya Ardija players
FK Velež Mostar players
Premier League of Bosnia and Herzegovina players
Serbian First League players
Serbian SuperLiga players
Slovak Super Liga players
J2 League players
Bosnia and Herzegovina expatriate footballers
Expatriate footballers in Serbia
Expatriate footballers in Slovakia
Expatriate footballers in Poland
Expatriate footballers in Japan
Bosnia and Herzegovina expatriate sportspeople in Serbia
Bosnia and Herzegovina expatriate sportspeople in Slovakia
Bosnia and Herzegovina expatriate sportspeople in Poland
Bosnia and Herzegovina expatriate sportspeople in Japan